Yuliya Znamenskaya (born 1 January 1984) is a Kazakhstani female water polo player. She was a member of the Kazakhstan women's national water polo team, playing as a driver. 

She competed at the 2007 World Aquatics Championships.

References

External links 
 Gillian Van Den Berg of Netherlands looks to block the pass from Yuliya Znamenskaya - Getty Images

Living people
1984 births
Kazakhstani female water polo players